Bandham may refer to:
 Bandham (1983 film), a 1983 Indian Malayalam film
 Bandham (1985 film), a 1985 Indian Tamil film
 Bandham (2018 TV series), an Indian Telugu language soap opera

See also